John Heathcote may refer to:

 Sir John Heathcote, 2nd Baronet (1689–1759), MP for Grantham and Bodmin
 John Heathcote (died 1795) (c. 1727–1795), MP for Rutland
 John Edensor Heathcote (died 1822), British industrialist
 John Heathcote (footballer) (1934–2008), Carlton Australian rules footballer from Victoria
 John Heathcote (1767–1838), MP for Ripon 1798–1806
 John Heathcote (cricketer) (1800–1897), English cricketer
 John Moyer Heathcote (1834–1912), English barrister and real tennis player

See also
 John Heathcoat (1783–1861), British inventor and MP for Tiverton